Shankarrao Shantaram More   is an Indian politician. He was elected to the Lok Sabha, the lower house of the Parliament of India.

References

External links
Official biographical sketch in Parliament of India website

India MPs 1952–1957
India MPs 1962–1967
Lok Sabha members from Maharashtra
1899 births
Year of death missing